Good Time is a 2017 American crime-thriller film directed by Josh and Benny Safdie and written by Josh Safdie and Ronald Bronstein. It stars Robert Pattinson as a small-time criminal who tries to free his developmentally-disabled brother, played by Benny Safdie, from police custody, while attempting to avoid his own arrest; Buddy Duress, Taliah Lennice Webster, Jennifer Jason Leigh, and Barkhad Abdi co-star. Electronic musician Oneohtrix Point Never wrote the film's score.

The film was selected to compete for the Palme d'Or in the main competition section of the 2017 Cannes Film Festival. It received critical acclaim for Pattinson's performance, the direction, the story, and the music.

Plot
In New York City, Nick Nikas sits uncomfortably in a court-ordered therapy session while Peter, a psychiatrist, attempts to conduct tests to determine the extent of Nick's cognitive and social impairment and arrive at a diagnosis. Just as Peter is trying to get Nick to talk about a violent incident with his grandmother, Nick's brother, Connie, bursts in and forces Nick out of the room. The Nikas brothers rob a bank for $65,000 and get into a waiting Uber. A dye pack in the bag of money soon explodes, causing the driver to crash, and Connie and Nick flee on foot. After washing the dye from their clothes, they are stopped by the police, and Nick runs. He is arrested and sent to Rikers Island, while Connie escapes.

That night, Connie attempts to secure a bail bond to get Nick out of jail. Most of the money from the robbery was destroyed by the dye, but he convinces his girlfriend, Corey, to pay the remaining $10,000 with her mother's credit card, only to discover her mother canceled the card. When Connie learns a fight with another inmate landed Nick in the hospital, he leaves Corey and goes to Elmhurst. Finding a room guarded by a police officer, he sneaks away with the patient, who is unconscious and bandaged, in a wheelchair. They get on an Acces-A-Ride bus, and Connie tricks Annie, one of the other riders, into letting them wait in her house until morning. Connie watches TV with Crystal, Annie's 16-year-old granddaughter. When his old mug shot appears on the news, he kisses her as a distraction. They are interrupted by the sounds of the patient regaining consciousness, and Connie discovers he did not break Nick out of the hospital, but rather a different criminal named Ray.

Ray recounts the story of his day to Connie, and Connie realizes that the bottle of LSD solution and bag of stolen money Ray's friends ditched in a haunted house ride in Adventureland while they were running from police are probably still there, as the friends were arrested and Ray was injured. Connie tells Crystal he wants to borrow Annie's car to take Ray home, and he, Crystal, and Ray drive to Adventureland. Leaving Crystal in the car, Connie and Ray search for the money, but find the LSD instead. They are caught by Dash, Adventureland's security guard, who says the police are on their way. Connie beats Dash unconscious and, when a police car arrives, steals Dash's uniform. Ray pours LSD down Dash's throat, and Connie tells the officers that Dash, who is hallucinating, is the intruder. Crystal is arrested when she gets out of Annie's car, and Connie watches the police take her away.

Unable to find the money, Connie and Ray go to Dash's apartment, where Connie befriends Dash's pit bull by letting it smell Dash's jacket. Ray, at Connie's insistence, calls his friend Caliph to offer to sell back the LSD, and, while they wait for Caliph and the sun rises, Ray begins drinking. Connie tells Ray that he is a leech on society, and they have a heated argument. Caliph arrives without any money, and Connie, protected by the dog, tells him to come back with $15,000. Although Caliph agrees, he tells Ray that he is really going to get a gun.

Sensing danger, Connie attempts to leave with the acid before Caliph returns. Ray attacks him in the hallway and tries to get the drugs, but Dash's dog attacks Ray. Connie gets away, and Ray escapes into the apartment, where, hearing sirens, he looks out the window and sees Connie get caught by the police. There is a pounding at the door, and Ray attempts to reach a neighboring apartment by climbing out a window, but he slips. As Connie is being put in a police car, he witnesses Ray fall to his death. Peter greets Nick and Nick's grandmother in a lobby. While he walks Nick back to join a class, Peter remarks that Connie did the "right thing", and both brothers are where they belong. Nick is initially very uncomfortable, but he gradually begins to participate in the group activity.

Cast

Production
On July 9, 2015, it was announced that Josh and Benny Safdie were set direct a caper film called Good Time, and that Robert Pattinson was attached to star. Sebastian Bear-McClard and Oscar Boyson of Elara Pictures produced the film, which Pattinson described as a "really hardcore kind of Queens, New York, mentally damaged psychopath, bank robbery movie."

Principal photography for the film took place in New York City in February and March 2016.

Music
Oneohtrix Point Never provided the film's score, which won the Soundtrack Award at the 2017 Cannes Film Festival. His work for the film included a collaboration with singer Iggy Pop, "The Pure and the Damned", which was used in a trailer and played over the film's end credits. The score was released as Oneohtrix Point Never's eighth studio album in August 2017.

The Safdie brothers directed a music video for "The Pure and the Damned", which featured Robert Pattinson and Benny Safdie reprising their roles as Connie and Nick, respectively, as well as a CGI stand-in for Iggy Pop.

Release
In October 2016, A24 acquired the film's distribution rights. It was selected to compete for the Palme d'Or in the main competition section of the 2017 Cannes Film Festival. The film began a limited theatrical release in the U.S. on August 11, 2017, and expanded wide two weeks later.

Reception

Critical response
On review aggregator website Rotten Tomatoes, the film has an approval rating of 91% based on 239 reviews, with an average rating of 7.6/10; the website's "critics consensus" reads: "A visual treat filled out by consistently stellar work from Robert Pattinson, Good Time is a singularly distinctive crime drama offering far more than the usual genre thrills." On Metacritic, the film has a weighted average score of 80 out of 100 based on 41 critics, indicating "generally favorable reviews".

Richard Brody of The New Yorker gave the film a glowing review, calling it "an instant crime classic in the age of Trump", and awarding specific praise to Pattinson's performance, as well as the Safdies' direction and Sean Price Williams' cinematography. David Rooney of The Hollywood Reporter gave the film a positive review, writing: "Led by Robert Pattinson giving arguably his most commanding performance to date as a desperate bank robber cut from the same cloth as Al Pacino's Sonny Wortzik in Dog Day Afternoon, this is a richly textured genre piece that packs a visceral charge in its restless widescreen visuals and adrenalizing music, which recalls the great mood-shaping movie scores of Tangerine Dream."

Guy Lodge of Variety also gave the film a positive review, and said that "Robert Pattinson hits a career high in Benny and Josh Safdie's nervy, vivid heist thriller, which merges messy humanity with tight genre mechanics." The Economist praised Pattinson's performance, saying it "establishes him as a capable character actor". Emily Yoshida of Vulture wrote: "For all its throttling thrills, Good Time is a film about a destructive love—and loving someone despite not having the right kind of love to give them. Ignore the deceptively convivial title: This is the kind of thrill that sticks."

Conversely, Rex Reed of Observer criticized the film, calling it "just under two hours of pointless toxicity," populated by brainless characters, filled with ludicrous writing, and laced with mostly over-the-top acting. He called the characters "so contrived that the movie defies even the most basic logic", and wrote that, "At best, it's a frenetic, disjointed and totally surreal look at people in crisis, seen through the eyes of other people in crisis.  It all takes place in one night, but it seems to last days." Likewise, A. O. Scott of The New York Times said: "Sometimes it flaunts its clichés—Nick's disability, and Benny Safdie's slack-jawed portrayal of it, is a big one—and other times it cloaks them in rough visual textures and jumpy, bumpy camera movements, so that a rickety genre thrill ride feels like something daring and new. It isn't. It's stale, empty and cold."

Accolades

References

External links
 
 
 
 
 Good Time at Letterboxd

2017 films
2017 independent films
2010s crime drama films
A24 (company) films
American crime drama films
Films about bank robbery
Films about brothers
Films about disability
Films about drugs
Films directed by the Safdie brothers
Films scored by Daniel Lopatin
Films set in Queens, New York
Films shot in New York City
Films set in Long Island
2017 drama films
American independent films
2010s English-language films
2010s American films